There are two places named Hardwick in the U.S. state of Georgia:

 Hardwick, Baldwin County, Georgia
 Hardwick, Bryan County, Georgia